Olesya Yurivna Rulina (born March 17, 1986) is a Russian-American actress. She is best known for co-starring in all three films of the High School Musical franchise as Kelsi Nielsen. She also starred in the films Private Valentine: Blonde & Dangerous (2008), Flying By (2009), Expecting Mary (2010) and Family Weekend (2013).

Early life
Olesya Rulin was born in Moscow, Russian SFSR, Soviet Union (now Russia). She spent her early childhood in Likhoslavl.

When Rulin was eight, she emigrated to the United States to rejoin her father who had done so two years earlier. They first lived in Texas, then later in Utah. Rulin graduated from West Jordan High School in 2005.

Rulin is also a trained ballet dancer. When she was 12, she entered a model-search contest at the urging of her mother and won representation by four different agencies. She can also play the piano.

Prior to acting full-time, she worked for a year as a certified nursing assistant and also at stores such as Victoria's Secret; she was working at a Nordstrom store when the first High School Musical came out. She was studying economics in Paris when the casting for High School Musical 2 took place.

Acting career
In addition to her role in High School Musical, High School Musical 2 and High School Musical 3: Senior Year, Rulin's credits include the Disney Channel original films Halloweentown High, The Poof Point and Hounded, the television series Everwood and the feature films Forever Strong, Mobsters and Mormons and The Dance.

Rulin's part in High School Musical 2 was significantly larger than that in the first film, including a solo in "You Are the Music in Me" and a few lines in "Work This Out." Rulin reprised her role as Kelsi Nielsen in High School Musical 3: Senior Year, also with a larger part, and performed three songs, including a duet with Lucas Grabeel.

Rulin  co-starred with Jessica Simpson in the film Major Movie Star (released in the United States under the title Private Valentine: Blonde & Dangerous). In 2009, Rulin  co-starred with Billy Ray Cyrus and Heather Locklear in the drama film Flying By.

In 2010, Rulin starred in Expecting Mary, which also starred Elliott Gould, Linda Gray, Lainie Kazan, Cloris Leachman, Della Reese, Cybill Shepherd, Gene Simmons and Fred Willard.

In 2013, she starred in Family Weekend with Kristin Chenoweth and Matthew Modine.

In August 2014, it was announced that Rulin would be playing the role of Callista Secor in the PlayStation Network series Powers, which ran for two seasons from 2015-16.

Filmography

Film

Television

References

External links

 
 

1986 births
21st-century American actresses
Actresses from Moscow
Actresses from Texas
Actresses from Utah
American child actresses
American film actresses
American soap opera actresses
American television actresses
Living people
Russian emigrants to the United States